The Second Book of Songs (title in Early Modern English: The Second Booke of Songs or Ayres of 2, 4 and 5 parts: with Tableture for the Lute or Orpherian, with the Violl de Gamba) is a book of songs composed by Renaissance composer John Dowland and published in London in 1600. He dedicated it to Lucy Russell, Countess of Bedford.

The book contains 22 songs plus an instrumental number, a "lesson for the Lute and Base Viol, called Dowlands a dew" (his First Book of Songs of 1597 contained 21 songs plus an instrumental number). The music is often described as lute songs, but this is somewhat misleading. The title page offers options regarding the instruments to be used. Also, some songs are appropriate for more than one voice, although madrigal-like scoring is less prominent than in the First Booke where all the songs can be performed in a four-part version.

Lyrics
Many of the lyrics are anonymous. There has been speculation that Dowland wrote some of his own lyrics, but there is not any firm evidence for this. Whoever wrote them, the quality has been recognised as being high.
Fine knacks for ladies, in which the anonymous poet takes on the role of a pedlar,  has been anthologised as an example of Elizabethan verse, for example in The Norton Anthology of Poetry.

Publication history
In his address to the "courteous reader" at the beginning of the First Book of Songs, Dowland announced his intention to publish more songs. The first book was printed by Peter Short, who had recently become involved in music printing. For the second book, Dowland turned to a different team - the publisher was George Eastland of Fleet Street (an obscure figure who appears to have known the Dowland family) and the printer was Thomas East, an experienced music printer. A fee had to be paid to Thomas Morley, who held a patent (a monopoly of music printing) from 1598.

On the title-page Dowland is correctly described as lutenist to the king of Denmark.  The manuscript was delivered by Mrs Dowland, but as Dowland was living abroad, he was not able to liaise with the printer, and the proofs were read by two composers who were in London at the time, John Wilbye and Edward Johnson.

Reception
The First Book was a commercial success and was reprinted four times during the composer's lifetime. The Second Book appears to have sold less well than expected, at any rate it was not reprinted by Thomas East. However, it includes songs which have become among the best known among the composer's output.

Recordings

An early example of a recording of a song from the Second Book is a 78 rpm record by Alfred Deller of Fine knacks for ladies with Desmond Dupré playing guitar. This was recorded at Abbey Road in 1949. In later recordings of this repertoire Deller's accompanist switched to the lute.

Song titles
I saw my Lady weepe
Flow my tears
Sorrow Stay
Die not before the day
Mourn, day is with darkness fled
Time's eldest son, Old Age
Then sit thee down
When others sing Venite
Praise blindness eyes
O sweet woods
If floods of tears
Fine knacks for ladies
Now cease my wand'ring eyes
Come ye heavy states of night
White as lilies was her face
Woeful heart
A Shepherd in a shade
Faction that ever dwells
Shall I sue
Toss not my soul
Clear or cloudy
Humour say what mak'st thou here (a Dialogue)

References

Nadal, David (1997). Lute Songs of John Dowland: The Original First and Second Books/ Transcribed for Voice and Guitar. Dover Publications Inc. .

External links

The Second Book of Songs
Compositions by John Dowland